The canton of Marck is an administrative division of the Pas-de-Calais department, in northern France. It was created at the French canton reorganisation which came into effect in March 2015. Its seat is in Marck.

It consists of the following communes:

Audruicq
Guemps
Marck
Muncq-Nieurlet
Nortkerque
Nouvelle-Église
Offekerque
Oye-Plage
Polincove
Recques-sur-Hem
Ruminghem
Saint-Folquin
Saint-Omer-Capelle
Sainte-Marie-Kerque
Vieille-Église
Zutkerque

References

Cantons of Pas-de-Calais